Naftali Bon (9 October 1945 – 2 November 2018) was a Kenyan athlete who competed mainly in the 400 metres. He was born in Kapsabet, Rift Valley Province.

He competed for Kenya in the 1968 Summer Olympics held in Mexico City in the 4 x 400 metre relay where he won the silver medal with his teammates Daniel Rudisha, Munyoro Nyamau and Charles Asati.  He shares the cover of the September 1969 issue of Track and Field News with Kip Keino. He died on 2 November 2018 at Kapsabet County Hospital.

References

External links
 

1945 births
2018 deaths
People from Nandi County
Kenyan male sprinters
Olympic silver medalists for Kenya
Athletes (track and field) at the 1968 Summer Olympics
Athletes (track and field) at the 1970 British Commonwealth Games
Olympic athletes of Kenya
Medalists at the 1968 Summer Olympics
Olympic silver medalists in athletics (track and field)
Commonwealth Games competitors for Kenya